Conrado de Regla Santos (November 26, 1934 – February 29, 2016) was a politician in the province of Manitoba, Canada. He was a member of the Legislative Assembly of Manitoba from 1981 to 1988, and again from 1990 to 2007.  Conrado as his family and friends called him, had three children: Evelyn Santos, Conrad Santos and Robert Santos.

The son of Federico Santos and Marcelina de Regla, he was born in the Philippines and was educated at Harvard University and the University of Michigan, receiving a PhD in political science from the latter institution. He moved to Winnipeg, Manitoba, Canada in 1965 after receiving a teaching position at the University of Manitoba, where he retired from in 2008.  Santos has also worked as a consultant for the Instituto Centro-Americano de Administracion Publica in Costa Rica, and was a board member of the Citizenship Council of Manitoba from 1977 to 1980.

He sought the New Democratic Party of Manitoba (NDP) nomination for Fort Garry in the 1973 election, but was defeated. He ran for the Winnipeg City Council in 1977 and 1980, but lost both times.

Santos was first elected to the Manitoba legislature in the 1981 provincial election as a New Democrat in the northwest Winnipeg riding of Burrows, defeating NDP-turned-Progressive Member of the Legislative Assembly (MLA) Ben Hanuschak.  He was re-elected in the 1986 election.  In June 1984, there were unconfirmed rumours that he was considering a move to the Progressive Conservative Party.

Santos lost the Burrows NDP nomination to Doug Martindale in 1988, and subsequently entered the party's leadership election.  He was not regarded as a prominent candidate, and received only five votes on the first ballot. He ran for mayor of Winnipeg in 1989, and finished a distant fourth.

In 1990, Santos won the NDP nomination for Broadway by a single vote over Marianne Cerilli, whose candidacy was supported by the party leadership.  He defeated Liberal incumbent Avis Gray in the 1990 general election, and was re-elected in the 1995 election.  In 1995, he endorsed Lorne Nystrom's bid to lead the federal NDP.

When the Broadway riding was eliminated by redistribution in 1999, Santos won the NDP nomination in Wellington (also in Winnipeg's northwest), and was returned by a wide margin in the 1999 provincial election.  He was again re-elected in the 2003 election.

Santos was named Deputy Speaker after the elections of 1986 and 1999.

Santos left the New Democratic Party caucus shortly before the 2007 provincial election after being accused of improperly selling party membership cards. He campaigned as an independent, and finished last in a field of five candidates.  He later pleaded guilty to paying the membership fees of as many as one hundred new party members, during the time when he was trying to retain his nomination.  He was fined $200 under the provincial Election Finances Act, as well as court fees of $150.  His lawyer argued that Santos was simply trying to help his low-income supporters, saying that the MLA "didn't have the heart" to request membership fees from people who were unable to feed their families.

He married Emerita Maglaya. Santos died in Winnipeg on February 29, 2016 at the age of 81.

Electoral results

Footnotes

1934 births
2016 deaths
University of Michigan alumni
Harvard University alumni
New Democratic Party of Manitoba MLAs
Politicians from Winnipeg
Filipino emigrants to Canada
Filipino expatriates in Canada
Naturalized citizens of Canada
21st-century Canadian politicians
Canadian politicians of Filipino descent